Mount Dayton is a mainly ice-free mountain,  high, at the east side of Amundsen Glacier, standing  west of Mount Goodale in the Hays Mountains. It was mapped from ground surveys and air photos by the Byrd Antarctic Expedition, 1928–30, and was named by the Advisory Committee on Antarctic Names for Paul K. Dayton III, a biologist with the McMurdo Station winter party of 1964.

References 

Mountains of the Ross Dependency
Amundsen Coast